Diisopropanolamine is a chemical compound with the molecular formula used as an emulsifier, stabilizer, and chemical intermediate.

Diisopropanolamine can be prepared by the reaction of isopropanolamine or ammonia with propylene oxide.

References

Amines
Diols